Devin Bowen and Ashley Fisher were the defending champions, but Bowen did not participate this year.  Fisher partnered Stephen Huss, losing in the first round.

Jaroslav Levinský and David Škoch won in the final 6–0, 2–6, 7–5, against José Acasuso and Luis Horna.

Seeds

Draw

Draw

External links
Draw

Dutch Open (tennis)
2004 ATP Tour
2004 Dutch Open (tennis)